162 Logistic Regiment RLC is an Army Reserve Regiment of the British Army's Royal Logistic Corps.

History
The regiment was formed in the Royal Corps of Transport as 162nd Movement Control Regiment, RCT (Volunteers) in 1967. It absorbed 88 Postal and Courier Regiment RLC and was re-named  as 162 Regiment RLC in 2013.

Structure
The current structure is as follows:
279 HQ Squadron at Bilborough, Nottingham
280 Movement Control Squadron at Swindon 
281 Movement Control Squadron at Bilborough, Nottingham 
282 Movement Control Squadron at Coulby Newham
871 Postal & Courier Squadron at Marlow
883 Postal & Courier Squadron at Hartlepool

References

External links
Official site

Regiments of the Royal Logistic Corps
Military units and formations established in 1967
Army Reserve (United Kingdom)